Carver High School was a public secondary school in Pascagoula, Mississippi. It served as the high school for black students until the public schools were integrated in 1971. The building stayed dormant until 2012, when it was reopened as the Aaron Jones Interactive Center, named after a longtime coach at Carver.

History
The first school for negroes in Pascagoula, known as "the Coloured School", was opened in 1890. In 1904 it expanded to two rooms. The school was later moved and renamed Pascagoula Negro Carver High School, then later renamed Carver High School. The first graduating class to attend all the way through was in 1941. In the 1970-1971 school year when the schools were integrated with the previously all-white Pascagoula High School, forty-two black students attended the integrated school.

Notable alumni
Dr. Calvin Huey, first African-American to play football at Navy graduated from Carver

References

Schools in Jackson County, Mississippi
Historically segregated African-American schools in Mississippi
Public high schools in Mississippi
Historically black schools